Mayara da Fonseca Bordin (born 4 September 1987), commonly known as Mayara or May, is a Brazilian former football midfielder who played for professional clubs in Brazil, Sweden and Spain, and for the Brazil women's national football team.

Club career

Mayara transferred from Centro Olímpico to Tyresö in January 2014, as one of four Brazilians to join the Swedish club.

Mayara was an unused substitute in Tyresö's 4–3 defeat by Wolfsburg in the 2014 UEFA Women's Champions League Final. Tyresö became insolvent in 2014 and were kicked out of the 2014 Damallsvenskan season, expunging all their results and making all their players free agents. The Stockholm County Administrative Board published the players' salaries, showing Mayara was a middle range earner at SEK 30 980 per month.

She returned to Centro Olímpico for the club's 2014 Campeonato Brasileiro de Futebol Feminino campaign.

Following two seasons in which she played in Spain, for Zaragoza and Málaga, respectively, Mayara decided to retire from playing in 2019 to take an administrative role with Club Athletico Paranaense.

International career
Mayara made her senior debut for Brazil in March 2013, in a 1–1 friendly draw with France in Rouen. In July 2013 she represented Brazil at the 2013 Summer Universiade in Kazan, Russia.

References

External links
 FIU player profile
 Centro Olímpico player profile
 

1987 births
Living people
Brazilian women's footballers
Brazil women's international footballers
Tyresö FF players
Damallsvenskan players
Zaragoza CFF players
Brazilian expatriate sportspeople in the United States
Brazilian expatriate sportspeople in Sweden
Brazilian expatriate sportspeople in Spain
FIU Panthers women's soccer players
Expatriate women's footballers in Sweden
Expatriate women's soccer players in the United States
Expatriate women's footballers in Spain
Associação Desportiva Centro Olímpico players
Sportspeople from Santa Catarina (state)
Women's association football midfielders
Feather River College alumni
Sport Club Corinthians Paulista (women) players
Universiade bronze medalists for Brazil
Universiade medalists in football
Málaga CF Femenino players